The Gihar are a Hindu caste found in various states of India. They belong to the Gipsy  clan.
They are considered to be among the migrating or partly settled communities .

History and origin
Gihara people are immigrants from Rajasthan after haldighati war, as we lost in war (Ghar harna) or (Greh hara), these words become gihara after many decades. Gihara people speaks mostly Gihara language which is derived from Parsi. Traditional work of Gihara's are old clothes trading, handicraft works like making kuchi (broom), murti (carving) etc. depending on different areas.

Present circumstances
The Gihara are strictly endogamous and are divided into many exogamous clans. These are the  Vaid ,Soda, Sankat, Bhainsh, Otwar, Gohar, Sani, Marriayyah, Khatabiya.

Many Gihara are still involved in their traditional occupation of stone sculpture. Some in ancient age were involved in rope making, chick making, bamboo fencing. Many people still engage in traditional occupations such as kuchbandiya and sirkibandiya. Many peoples engage themselves in cottage industries (small industries occupations).

References    

Indian castes